Mumbai City district is a district of Maharashtra in Konkan Division. As a city district, it has no headquarters or subdivisions. It, along with the Mumbai Suburban District, makes up the metropolis of Mumbai. This area is called the "Island City" or South Mumbai or Old Mumbai. It extends from Colaba in the south to Mahim and Sion in the north.

Officer

Members of Parliament

Rahul Shewale (BSS) 
Arvind Sawant (SS(UBT))

Guardian Minister

list of Guardian Minister

District Magistrate/Collector

list of District Magistrate / Collector

History

The city of Mumbai came in light in the year 150 CE through the geographical work of renowned geographer, Ptolemy. The city, consisting of several islands, was then ruled by native Agris and Kolis. These natives ruled the islands up to 1345. Thereafter, Mumbai's rulers changed through history until Islamic rulers conquered what is now Maharashtra and conquered some of the islands in 1534. Subsequently, sultan of Gujarat took over all the islands, which were then conquered by the Portuguese.

Following the continued support of England in the Anglo-Portuguese Alliance, stemming from the Anglo-Portuguese Treaty of 1373 and on the accession of a Catholic monarch in 1660, in 1661 the island of Mumbai was given to the British as part of a Royal Dowry, on the occasion of the marriage of King Charles II of England with the Portuguese Princess Infanta Catherine of Braganza. The island of Mumbai, was then to remain part of British Raj until 15 August 1947, when it became an autonomous dominion. Initially, Charles II entrusted the administration of Mumbai to the East India Company.

By a Royal Charter under the Regulation XIX of 1827, passed by the British Government, the Collector of Mumbai was made the Chief Controlling Authority of the Revenue Administration of Mumbai. The Collector of Mumbai enjoyed vast authority under the Mumbai Land Revenue Act 1876 which was repealed by the Maharashtra Land Revenue Code 1966.

Demographics
According to the 2011 census Mumbai City district has a population of 3,085,411, roughly equal to the nation of Mongolia or the US state of Iowa. This gives it a ranking of 115th in India (out of a total of 640). Its population growth rate over the decade 2001-2011 was -7.57%. Mumbai City has a sex ratio of 832 females for every 1000 males, and a literacy rate of 89.21%. Scheduled Castes and Scheduled Tribes make up 7.13% and 0.81% of the population respectively.

Religion

Hinduism is the main religion. Islam is the second-largest religion, Jainism is practiced by Gujaratis, while Buddhism is found among the Marathis. Mumbai also has the largest population of Parsis in the world, although their population is fast dwindling.

Language

Marathi is the official and most spoken language of the district. However being one of the largest cities in the country, Mumbai has attracted speakers of a large number of languages. Other languages with significant number of speakers in the district include Hindi, Urdu, Gujarati, and Tamil.

At the time of the 2011 Census of India, 35.96% of the population in the district spoke Marathi, 22.98% Hindi, 13.53% Urdu, 11.34% Gujarati, 2.93% Tamil, 2.57% Marwadi, 2.37% Telugu, 1.38% Konkani and 1.31% Bengali as their first language.

See also 

 Mumbai Metropolitan Area
 Districts of Maharashtra
 Chennai district
 Kolkata district
 National Capital Territory of Delhi

References

External links

Govt of Maharashtra
Official site of Mumbai city district

 
Districts of Maharashtra
Mumbai
Konkan division